Winssen is a village in the Dutch province of Gelderland. It is the smallest village of the municipality of Beuningen, and lies about 8 km north of Wijchen. It lies south of the river Waal

Winssen was a separate municipality until 1818, when it was merged with Ewijk.

It was first mentioned in 1153 as Winisen. The etymology is unclear. Huis te Winssen was a castle located near the village. In 1584, it fell in Spanish hands, and was destroyed by the citizens of Nijmegen. It was later rebuilt, but demolished around 1815. In 1840, Winssen was home to 909 people.

The Beatrixmolen is a grist mill from 1791 which was originally located in Alphen. In 1858, it was rebuilt and moved to Winssen. In 1988, it was restored.

References

Gallery 

Populated places in Gelderland
Former municipalities of Gelderland
Beuningen